The FIL World Luge Championships 1955 took place in Oslo, Norway under the auspices of the Fédération Internationale de Bobsleigh et de Tobogganing (FIBT - International Bobsleigh and Tobogganing Federation in ) under their "Section de Luge". It would be the only world championship under the FIBT until formation of the International Luge Federation (FIL) in 1957.

Men's singles

Women's singles

Men's doubles

The Issers were the first man and woman to medal in doubles in the history of the World Championships, European Championships, or Winter Olympics.

Medal table

References
Men's doubles World Champions
Men's singles World Champions
Women's singles World Champions

FIL World Luge Championships
1955 in luge
1955 in Norwegian sport
Luge in Norway